This is a list of members of the Western Australian Legislative Council from 22 May 1906 to 21 May 1908. The chamber had 30 seats made up of ten provinces each electing three members, on a system of rotation whereby one-third of the members would retire at each biennial election.

Notes
 On 7 May 1906, North-East Province MLC James Connolly was appointed Colonial Secretary and Minister for Commerce and Labour in the new Ministry led by Newton Moore. He was therefore required to resign and contest a ministerial by-election, at which he was returned unopposed on 16 May 1906.
 On 6 November 1906, North Province MLC Edward Wittenoom resigned. Richard Pennefather won the resulting by-election on 15 January 1907.
 On 21 July 1907, East Province MLC Charles Dempster resigned. George Throssell, who had served briefly as Premier in 1901, won the resulting by-election on 12 August 1907.

Sources
 
 

Members of Western Australian parliaments by term